Asprey International Limited, formerly Asprey & Garrard Limited, is a United Kingdom-based designer, manufacturer and retailer of jewellery, silverware, home goods, leather goods, timepieces, and a retailer of books.

Asprey's flagship retail store is located on Bruton Street, Mayfair in London, United Kingdom. Asprey has supplied crowns, coronets, and sceptres for royal families around the world. , holds a Royal Warrant from the Prince of Wales.

From 1996 to 1998, Asprey held a partnership with Ferrari's Formula 1 team.

History

Foundation
Asprey was established in England in Mitcham, Surrey, in 1781. Founded as a silk printing business by William Asprey, it soon became a luxury emporium. In 1841, William Asprey's elder son Charles went into partnership with a stationer located on London's Bond Street. In 1847, the family broke with this partner and moved into 167 New Bond Street Celebrating 240 years, Asprey moves to Mayfair's Bruton Street, the original location of its first workshops and the birthplace of Her Majesty Queen Elizabeth.

From its central London location, Asprey advertised 'articles of exclusive design and high quality, whether for personal adornment or personal accompaniment and to endow with richness and beauty the table and homes of people of refinement and discernment.' An early speciality was dressing cases. Asprey crafted traditional cases and designs, mostly in leather, suitable for the new style of travel ushered in by railways. The main competitors at the time were H.J. Cave & Sons. Asprey was recognized for its expertise when it won honorable mention for its dressing cases at the International Exhibition of 1862, but it ultimately lost out to its rivals, H.J. Cave & Sons, in both 1862 & 1867.

The company consolidated its position through acquisitions. In 1859, Asprey absorbed Edwards, a maker of dressing cases and holder of a Royal Warrant. Soon after the merger, Asprey would lose this warrant. The company also purchased the Alfred Club at 22 Albemarle Street, which backed on to the New Bond Street store and meant that Asprey now had entrances on two of London's most fashionable streets.

20th century
As the business grew, the company acquired manufacturing facilities and hired silversmiths, goldsmiths, jewellers and watchmakers including Ernest Betjeman, the father of the distinguished poet John Betjeman, one of the most highly regarded craftsman and designers of his day. In the 1920s, commissions poured in from around the world, from American billionaire J. Pierpont Morgan to potentates such as the Maharaja of Patiala, who commissioned a huge teak travelling trunk for each of his wives, in which each trunk was fitted with solid silver washing and bathing utensils with waterspouts of ornate tiger head and lined with blue velvet. Asprey cigarette cases became collectable amongst young sophisticates who delighted in its other modern products, including travel clocks, safety razors and automatic pencil sharpeners.

Key dates
 1781: Asprey begins trading as William Asprey in Mitcham, Surrey
 1847: Asprey flagship store opens on New Bond Street, London
 1851: Asprey receives an 'Honourable Mention' at the Great Exhibition for their lady's dressing case with 'Annie' cipher.
 1862: Royal Warrant granted by Queen Victoria
 1889: Edward VII grants the second Royal Warrant to Asprey
 1925: HM Queen Mary commissions a necklace, later given to HRH Princess Margaret on the occasion of her 18th birthday
 1930: Maharaja of Patiala commissions five trunks, one for each of his five wives
 1973: Bespoke chess set is commissioned for Ringo Starr's birthday
 1975: Asprey received the Queen's Award to Industry by Queen Elizabeth
 1990: Asprey and Garrard merge
 2002: Asprey and Garrard split
 2004: Lord Foster of Thames Bank redesigns the flagship store in New Bond Street, London 
 2006: Asprey celebrates its 225th anniversary and is granted a coat of arms by the English College of Arms
 2006: Sciens Capital Management and Plainfield Asset Management purchase the brand
 2009: Asprey becomes the official jewellery sponsor of The Orange British Academy Film Awards
 2012: Katie Hillier creates new autumn/winter collection
 2012: Asprey collaborates with light artist Chris Levine to create The Diamond Queen for the Queen's Diamond Jubilee
 2012: May – New York based Luxury Institute ranks Asprey in the top two luxury brands for 2012
 2014: Bovet 1822 join Asprey's Timepiece portfolio
 2015: Asprey becomes an official retailer of Rolex Watches, London
 2016: Asprey becomes the official Jewellery sponsor of The Olivier Awards
 2017: Opening of Asprey at Takashimaya Osaka and Sunmotoyama Ginza, Japan
 2017: Celebration of the twenty year anniversary of the Asprey Boutique, Beverly Hills Hotel
 2018: Asprey launches the Beverly Hills Collection
 2021: Asprey celebrates its 240th Anniversary
 2021: Asprey Collaborates with Formula 1 
 2021: Asprey moves its flagship store to Mayfair's Bruton Street, its permanent location.
 2022: Asprey 240 Launches its Digital Studio in the new flagship store
 2022: Asprey Collaborates with Bugatti  on 'La Voiture Noire' Collection of Sculptures + NFTs

Products

Jewellery
Asprey has a tradition of producing jewellery inspired by the blooms found in English gardens and Woodland Flora. Over the decades, jewelled interpretations of flowers have evolved to include Daisy, Woodland and sunflower collections.

Asprey cut
The master diamond cutter Gabi Tolkowsky created the Asprey cut. The cushion cut gave Tolkowsky options for incorporating the Asprey "A" inscription around the edges of the stone. The result was the 61-facet Asprey cut, maximising light refraction to brilliant effect. Carat weights of Asprey-cut diamonds range from 0.50 to 3. Asprey-cut diamonds are inscribed on one side of the cushion with the GIA certificate number and with four distinctive 'A's on the other. It is also the only diamond that has the letter "A" on the crown; the Asprey cut has a flower in the centre to create softness. The shape of the Asprey cut means that the cutting process can be done only by hand, unlike many other stones that involve machine cutting.

Leather goods
The latest handbag collection is the Beverly Hills collection, inspired by the 20th anniversary of the Boutique at the Beverly Hills Hotel, Los Angeles
The men's collection includes wallets, cardholders and travel watch cases. Other items include briefcases and backgammon boards.
Asprey's signature silhouettes, have been carried by Prime Minister, Margaret Thatcher, Elizabeth Taylor and many worn on the Red Carpet at prestigious events.

Silver
Asprey offers classic and contemporary silver pieces – such as sterling silver cocktail shakers, in traditional and contemporary, novel designs such as the Rocket cocktail shaker and many barware accompaniments. 
Asprey also produce children's items, including tooth boxes, picture frames and rattles.

Trophies
Asprey have designed and manufactured sporting trophies, including the Race To Dubai trophy and the Dubai World Championship (DWC) trophy. In addition, Asprey is responsible for crafting the ICC cricket trophies, Wimbledon championship runner-up and winner's salvers, the Arab Club Champions Cup trophy as well as the FA Cup, and Premier League medals.

Books
The Asprey fine and rare book tradition evolved from the early 1900s when small compendia of reference books were produced. However, it was not until the Second World War, when raw materials were in such short supply, that Asprey began to offer second-hand and antiquarian books. Following the war, this practice was further developed to include a range of books, old and new, that were bound by Asprey, thus augmenting the company's tradition in leather goods. Today, Asprey offers a range of first and limited editions, many in their original bindings and some if appropriate, in leather bindings customised by Asprey.

Asprey Polo
Previously known as Argosy, Asprey Polo has developed products for player and pony. The range includes boots, saddles, bridles, helmets and mallets and is available from Asprey Polo. Asprey has a history in polo, sponsoring teams and creating trophies for polo tournaments. It sponsored a 40-goal team in the Argentine Open in 1996, winning the Championship and reaching the final in 1997.

Bespoke and master craftsmanship
Asprey has maintained its London workshops  allowing repairs and alterations to be completed while a customer waits. An expanded jewellery, silver and leather workshop based in London are where classic skills are employed by expert silversmiths, goldsmiths, jewellers, leatherworkers, engravers and watchmakers.

Asprey will go to any length to meet a customer's requirements. The firm's craftsmen actually made a silver-gilt sandwich.  They toasted three slices of bread in their workshop, fried the eggs, broiled the bacon, assembled the sandwich, made a mould, and cast it. It now sits on the desk of a Texan millionaire.
The motto is 'It Can be Done'.

"The Diamond Queen"
To mark Queen Elizabeth II's Diamond Jubilee, Asprey partnered with light artist Chris Levine to create a new work based upon his 2004 portrait "Equanimity", commissioned by The Jersey Heritage Trust in 2004. This new work is entitled "The Diamond Queen".

Asprey re-created the Queen's diamond diadem, worn at the Coronation in 1953. One thousand white diamonds are being set in platinum by Asprey craftsmen and overlaid onto the original three-dimensional image of Her Majesty to create the luminescent installation.

Royal patronage
In 1862, Asprey was granted a Royal Warrant by Queen Victoria. The Prince of Wales, later to be crowned Edward VII, granted another Royal Warrant. In 1953, for the coronation of Elizabeth II, Asprey paid homage with the Asprey Coronation Year Gold Collection, which featured a dessert, coffee and liqueur service in 18-carat gold and weighed almost 27 pounds. In April 1953, it went on show in the New Bond Street store and subsequently toured the United States.
Asprey today holds a Royal warrant as silversmiths and Goldsmiths under HRH Prince of Wales patronage.

In popular culture

Film
Asprey designed the Heart of the Ocean necklace that was featured in the 1997 James Cameron blockbuster Titanic.
Asprey has featured in a number of films:

 Help! (1965)
 Titanic (1997)
 Flawless
 Match Point (2005)
 Notes on a Scandal (2006)
 Sherlock Holmes
 Confessions of a Shopaholic (2009)
 The Ghost Writer
 Nanny McPhee: The Big Bang (2010)
 The Tourist
 The 2011 film My Week with Marilyn was filmed at Asprey, 167 New Bond Street

In 2009, Asprey became the official jewellery sponsor of The Orange British Academy Film Awards and continues this partnership today.
Asprey collaborated with screen stars, Angelina Jolie and Brad Pitt to create the Asprey's Protector Collection of fine jewellery for both children and adults in 2009.

Literature
 In Jeffrey Archer's novel First Among Equals, Raymond Gould gives his mistress an Asprey miniature of a ministerial red box inscribed with the words "For Your Eyes Only."
 In Kevin Kwan's novel Rich People Problems, Edison Cheng learns that the only items bequeathed to him in family matriarch Shang Su Yi's will are a pair of Asprey sapphire-and-platinum cuff links previously given to his grandfather, Sir James Young, by a Malaysian sultan.

Corporate
Asprey continues to trade as a luxury goods house, active in market such as the US and Japan. According to a survey of US high-net-worth consumers polled for the Luxury Institute's 2012 Luxury Brand Status Index, Asprey was ranked among the top two of international fine jewellery brands, able to deliver true luxury.
In March 2006, Sciens Capital Management, the US private equity firm, bought Asprey. "This is a historic luxury brand, and that is part of our reason for acquiring it," said chairman John Rigas, following the purchase from Lawrence Stroll, Silas Chou (of Sportswear Holdings Ltd) and Edgar Bronfman Jr.

Subsequently, Rigas has re-focused the business to concentrate on flagships and stand alone stores in key international locations. In 2009, Hermés, the French luxury fashion house, made a property investment purchasing the freehold of the New Bond Street shop that Asprey occupied. Asprey held a 31-year lease on the premises and continued to remain in the space until 2021.
Asprey moved to 36 Bruton Street at the end of 2021, its new permanent flagship, firstly creating an installation space designed by the Storey Group, an immersive experience of discovery and exploration.

References
 Noon, Chris. "Billionaire Burkle Buys U.K. Crown Jeweller" Forbes, 21 March 2006, retrieved 21 November 2006.

External links

 

British Royal Warrant holders
Manufacturing companies established in 1781
Retail companies established in 1847
Jewellery retailers of the United Kingdom
English brands
Fashion accessory brands
High fashion brands
Companies based in the City of Westminster
1781 establishments in England

ru:Asprey